The 2007 Rally Japan was the 14th round of the 2007 World Rally Championship. It took place between 26 and 28 October 2007.

Report 
Ford Mikko Hirvonen took the lead on Friday afternoon after overtaking Jari-Matti Latvala. Hirvonen then led the rally to the end. After team-mate Marcus Grönholm had already retired on Friday morning, the task was to keep Sébastien Loeb behind and thereby take points from him in the Drivers' World Championship. Hirvonen did that with success, he put the three-time world champion under pressure and fought an exciting battle for the top with him.

The situation changed on Saturday afternoon. Loeb was also eliminated after his co-driver Daniel Elena misread a pace note. Third-placed Latvala, who had led the rally at the start, also had to retire after an accident. Both later started again under the Rallye 2 regulations. So Hirvonen had a new pursuer Daniel Sordo. However, Hirvonen's lead was already large enough for him to control the rally. In the end, Hirvonen had a 37.4 second lead over Sordo. Loeb won four special stages on Sunday, after which he finally had to retire due to oil pressure problems.

Results

Retirements
  Marcus Grönholm - went off the road (SS4);
  Chris Atkinson - crashed his car (SS6);
  Fumio Nutahara - mechanical (SS14);
  Sébastien Loeb - mechanical (SS26);
  Armindo Araujo - excluded after post-rally technical check;

Special Stages 
All dates and times are JST (UTC+9).

Championship standings after the event

Drivers' championship

Manufacturers' championship

References

External links 

 Results on the official site: WRC.com
 Results on eWRC.com
 Results at Jonkka's World Rally Archive

Japan
2007
Rally